Frank Richards may refer to:

Frank Richards (performer), vaudeville performer
the pseudonym of Charles Hamilton (writer) (1876–1961), writer of the Greyfriars School stories
the pseudonym of many "substitute writers" of Greyfriars stories, such as Edwy Searles Brooks (1889–1965)
Frank Richards (cricketer) (1863–1926), Australian cricketer
Frank Richards (football manager) (c. 1880–1963), manager of English football clubs
Frank Richards (actor) (1909–1992), American actor
Frank H. Richards (1858–1937), American politician
Frank Richards (British Army soldier) (1883–1961), soldier and author

See also
Frank Richard
Franklin Richards (disambiguation)
Francis Richards (disambiguation)
Frances Richards (disambiguation)